The Korkeakoski railway station is a railway station located in the municipality of Juupajoki, Finland, in the municipal seat and urban area of Korkeakoski. It is located along the Tampere–Haapamäki railway.

The Finnish Heritage Agency has proclaimed the Korkeakoski industrial community, of which the railway station is part of, as a built cultural environment of national significance.

History 

Korkeakoski, being one of the original stations of the Tampere–Haapamäki railway, was opened on 29 September 1883. Its location was based on its proximity to the Korkeakoski mill; the railway also crossed with the road between the Juupajoki church and Ruovesi. In the next decade, Korkeakoski's growth into an industrial locality began to take off with Edward Wallenius investing in the establishment of several factories: first a sawmill and a mechanized leather factory in 1894, followed by a shoe factory in 1898. His decision to found the facilities in Korkeakoski stemmed not only from the presence of the railway, but also that of the Korkeakoski rapids, providing potential for the use of hydropower. Originally a part of Orivesi, Korkeakoski became part of the newly independent municipality of Juupajoki in 1913.

Passenger services in Korkeakoski were abolished in 1990; 8 years later, a new halt was constructed closer to the center of the municipality, and was named Juupajoki after it. The halt was opened for traffic on 31 May 1998. Korkeakoski became an unmanned station in 2004.

Services 
The Juupajoki halt is served by all regional trains on the routes Tampere–Haapamäki–Jyväskylä; the default type of rolling stock for the route is the Dm12 railbus.

Architecture 
The station building in Korkeakoski was constructed according to the stock blueprints for the smaller pysäkki stations on the Tampere–Haapamäki railway, and was completed in 1883. In 1901, it almost doubled in size after the completion of an extension designed by Bruno Granholm.

See also 
 Lyly railway station

References 

Railway stations opened in 1883
Railway stations in Pirkanmaa